The meaning of spirituality has developed and expanded over time, and various meanings can be found alongside each other. Traditionally, spirituality referred to a religious process of re-formation which "aims to recover the original shape of man", oriented at "the image of God" as exemplified by the founders and sacred texts of the religions of the world. The term was used within early Christianity to refer to a life oriented toward the Holy Spirit and broadened during the Late Middle Ages to include mental aspects of life.

In modern times, the term both spread to other religious traditions and broadened to refer to a wider range of experiences, including a range of esoteric and religious traditions. Modern usages tend to refer to a subjective experience of a sacred dimension and the "deepest values and meanings by which people live", often in a context separate from organized religious institutions. This may involve belief in a supernatural realm beyond the ordinarily observable world, personal growth, a quest for an ultimate or sacred meaning, religious experience,  or an encounter with one's own "inner dimension".

Etymology
The term spirit means "animating or vital principle in man and animals". It is derived from the Old French , which comes from the Latin word  (soul, ghost, courage, vigor, breath) and is related to spirare (to breathe). In the Vulgate the Latin word  is used to translate the Greek pneuma and Hebrew ruach.

The term "spirituality" is derived from Middle French , from Late Latin "spiritualitatem" (nominative ), which is also derived from Latin .

Definition
There is no single, widely agreed-upon definition of spirituality. Surveys of the definition of the term, as used in scholarly research, show a broad range of definitions with limited overlap. A survey of reviews by McCarroll, each dealing with the topic of spirituality, gave twenty-seven explicit definitions among which "there was little agreement". This causes some difficulty in trying to study spirituality systematically; i.e., it impedes both understanding and the capacity to communicate findings in a meaningful fashion.

According to Kees Waaijman, the traditional meaning of spirituality is a process of re-formation that "aims to recover the original shape of man, the image of God. To accomplish this, the re-formation is oriented at a mold, which represents the original shape: in Judaism the Torah, in Christianity there is Christ, for Buddhism, Buddha, and in Islam, Muhammad." Houtman and Aupers suggest that modern spirituality is a blend of humanistic psychology, mystical and esoteric traditions, and Eastern religions. 

In modern times the emphasis is on subjective experience  and the "deepest values and meanings by which people live", incorporating personal growth or transformation, usually in a context separate from organized religious institutions. Spirituality can be defined generally as an individual's search for ultimate or sacred meaning, and purpose in life. Additionally it can mean to seek out or search for personal growth, religious experience, belief in a supernatural realm or afterlife, or to make sense of one's own "inner dimension".

Development of the meaning of spirituality

Classical, medieval, and early modern periods
Bergomi detects "an enlightened form of non-religious spirituality" in late antiquity.

Words translatable as "spirituality" first began to arise in the 5th century and only entered common use toward the end of the Middle Ages. In a Biblical context the term means being animated by God. The New Testament offers the concept of being driven by the Holy Spirit, as opposed to living a life in which one rejects this influence.

In the 11th century, this meaning changed. "Spirituality" began to denote the mental aspect of life, as opposed to the material and sensual aspects of life, "the ecclesiastical sphere of light against the dark world of matter". In the 13th century "spirituality" acquired a social and psychological meaning. Socially it denoted the territory of the clergy: "the ecclesiastical against the temporary possessions, the ecclesiastical against the secular authority, the clerical class against the secular class". Psychologically, it denoted the realm of the inner life: "the purity of motives, affections, intentions, inner dispositions, the psychology of the spiritual life, the analysis of the feelings".

In the 17th and 18th centuries a distinction was made between higher and lower forms of spirituality: "A spiritual man is one who is Christian 'more abundantly and deeper than others'." The word was also associated with mysticism and quietism, and acquired a negative meaning.

Modern spirituality

Modern notions of spirituality developed throughout the 19th and 20th centuries, mixing Christian ideas with Western esoteric traditions and elements of Asian, especially Indian, religions. Spirituality became increasingly disconnected from traditional religious organizations and institutions. It is sometimes associated today with philosophical, social, or political movements such as liberalism, feminist theology, and green politics.

Transcendentalism and Unitarian Universalism
Ralph Waldo Emerson (1803–1882) was a pioneer of the idea of spirituality as a distinct field. He was one of the major figures in Transcendentalism, an early 19th-century liberal Protestant movement, which was rooted in English and German Romanticism, the Biblical criticism of Johann Gottfried Herder and Friedrich Schleiermacher, the skepticism of Hume, and Neoplatonism.
The Transcendentalists emphasized an intuitive, experiential approach to religion. Following Schleiermacher, an individual's intuition of truth was taken as the criterion for truth. In the late 18th and early 19th century, the first translations of Hindu texts appeared, which were also read by the Transcendentalists, and influenced their thinking. They also endorsed universalist and Unitarianist ideas, leading to Unitarian Universalism, the idea that there must be truth in other religions as well since a loving God would redeem all living beings, not just Christians.

Theosophy, anthroposophy, and the perennial philosophy

A major influence on modern spirituality was the Theosophical Society, which searched for 'secret teachings' in Asian religions. It has been influential on modernist streams in several Asian religions, notably Neo-Vedanta, the revival of Theravada Buddhism, and Buddhist modernism, which have taken over modern western notions of personal experience and universalism and integrated them in their religious concepts. A second, related influence was Anthroposophy, whose founder, Rudolf Steiner, was particularly interested in developing a genuine Western spirituality, and in the ways that such a spirituality could transform practical institutions such as education, agriculture, and medicine. More independently, the spiritual science of Martinus was an influence, especially in Scandinavia.

The influence of Asian traditions on western modern spirituality was also furthered by the perennial philosophy, whose main proponent Aldous Huxley was deeply influenced by Swami Vivekananda's Neo-Vedanta and universalism, and the spread of social welfare, education and mass travel after World War II.

Neo-Vedanta

An important influence on western spirituality was Neo-Vedanta, also called neo-Hinduism and Hindu Universalism, a modern interpretation of Hinduism which developed in response to western colonialism and orientalism. It aims to present Hinduism as a "homogenized ideal of Hinduism" with Advaita Vedanta as its central doctrine. Due to the colonisation of Asia by the western world, since the 19th century an exchange of ideas has been taking place between the western world and Asia, which also influenced western religiosity. Unitarianism, and the idea of Universalism, was brought to India by missionaries, and had a major influence on neo-Hinduism via Ram Mohan Roy's Brahmo Samaj and Brahmoism. Roy attempted to modernise and reform Hinduism, from the idea of Universalism. This universalism was further popularised, and brought back to the west as neo-Vedanta, by Swami Vivekananda.

"Spiritual but not religious"

After the Second World War, spirituality and theistic religion became increasingly disconnected, and spirituality became more oriented on subjective experience, instead of "attempts to place the self within a broader ontological context". A new discourse developed, in which (humanistic) psychology, mystical and esoteric traditions and eastern religions are being blended, to reach the true self by self-disclosure, free expression, and meditation.

The distinction between the spiritual and the religious became more common in the popular mind during the late 20th century with the rise of secularism and the advent of the New Age movement.  Authors such as Chris Griscom and Shirley MacLaine explored it in numerous ways in their books. Paul Heelas noted the development within New Age circles of what he called "seminar spirituality": structured offerings complementing consumer choice with spiritual options.

Among other factors, declining membership of organized religions and the growth of secularism in the western world have given rise to this broader view of spirituality. The term "spiritual" is now frequently used in contexts in which the term "religious" was formerly employed. Both theists and atheists have criticized this development.

Traditional spirituality

Abrahamic faiths

Judaism
Spirituality in Judaism may involve practices of Jewish ethics, Jewish prayer, Jewish meditation, Shabbat and holiday observance, Torah study, dietary laws, teshuvah, and other practices. It may involve practices ordained by halakhah or other practices.

Kabbalah (literally "receiving") is an esoteric method, discipline and school of thought of Judaism. Kabbalah is a set of esoteric teachings meant to explain the relationship between an unchanging, eternal and mysterious Ein Sof (no end) and the mortal and finite universe (his creation). Interpretations of Kabbalistic spirituality are found within Hasidic Judaism, a branch of Orthodox Judaism founded in 18th-century Eastern Europe by Rabbi Israel Baal Shem Tov. Hasidism often emphasizes the Immanent Divine presence and focuses on emotion, fervour, and the figure of the Tzadik. This movement included an elite ideal of nullification to paradoxical Divine Panentheism.

The Musar movement is a Jewish spiritual movement that has focused on developing character traits such as faith, humility, and love.  The Musar movement, first founded in the 19th century by Israel Salanter and developed in the 21st century by Alan Morinis and Ira F. Stone, has encouraged spiritual practices of Jewish meditation, Jewish prayer, Jewish ethics, tzedakah, teshuvah, and the study of musar (ethical) literature.

Reform Judaism and Conservative Judaism have often emphasized the spirituality of Jewish ethics and tikkun olam, feminist spirituality, Jewish prayer, Torah study, ritual, and musar.

Christianity

Catholic spirituality is the spiritual practice of living out a personal act of faith (fides qua creditur) following the acceptance of faith (fides quae creditur). Although all Catholics are expected to pray together at Mass, there are many different forms of spirituality and private prayer which have developed over the centuries. Each of the major religious orders of the Catholic Church and other lay groupings have their own unique spirituality – its own way of approaching God in prayer and in living out the Gospel.

Christian mysticism refers to the development of mystical practices and theory within Christianity. It has often been connected to mystical theology, especially in the Catholic and Eastern Orthodox traditions. The attributes and means by which Christian mysticism is studied and practiced are varied and range from ecstatic visions of the soul's mystical union with God to simple prayerful contemplation of Holy Scripture (i.e., Lectio Divina).

Progressive Christianity is a contemporary movement which seeks to remove the supernatural claims of the faith and replace them with a post-critical understanding of biblical spirituality based on historical and scientific research. It focuses on the lived experience of spirituality over historical dogmatic claims, and accepts that the faith is both true and a human construction, and that spiritual experiences are psychologically and neurally real and useful.

Islam
An inner spiritual struggle and an outer physical struggle are two commonly accepted meanings of the Arabic word jihad: The "greater jihad" is the inner struggle by a believer to fulfill his religious duties. This non-violent meaning is stressed by both Muslim and non-Muslim authors.

Al-Khatib al-Baghdadi, an 11th-century Islamic scholar, referenced a statement by the companion of Muhammad, Jabir ibn Abd-Allah:

Sufism

The best known form of Islamic mystic spirituality is the Sufi tradition (famous through Rumi and Hafiz) in which a Sheikh or pir transmits spiritual discipline to students.

Sufis believe they are practicing ihsan (perfection of worship) as revealed by Gabriel to Muhammad,

Sufis consider themselves as the original true proponents of this pure original form of Islam. They are strong adherents to the principal of tolerance, peace and against any form of violence. The Sufi have suffered severe persecution by more rigid and fundamentalist groups such as the Wahhabi and Salafi movement. In 1843 the Senussi Sufi were forced to flee Mecca and Medina and head to Sudan and Libya.

Classical Sufi scholars have defined Sufism as "a science whose objective is the reparation of the heart and turning it away from all else but God". Alternatively, in the words of the Darqawi Sufi teacher Ahmad ibn Ajiba, "a science through which one can know how to travel into the presence of the Divine, purify one's inner self from filth, and beautify it with a variety of praiseworthy traits".

Indian religions

Jainism 
Jainism, traditionally known as Jain Dharma, is an ancient Indian religion. The three main pillars of Jainism are ahiṃsā (non-violence), anekāntavāda (non-absolutism), and aparigraha (non-attachment). Jains take five main vows: ahiṃsā (non-violence), satya (truth), asteya (not stealing), brahmacharya (sexual continence), and aparigraha (non-possessiveness). These principles have affected Jain culture in many ways, such as leading to a predominantly vegetarian lifestyle. Parasparopagraho jīvānām (the function of souls is to help one another) is the faith's motto and the Ṇamōkāra mantra is its most common and basic prayer.

Jainism traces its spiritual ideas and history through a succession of twenty-four leaders or Tirthankaras, with the first in the current time cycle being Rishabhadeva, whom the tradition holds to have lived millions of years ago; the twenty-third tirthankara Parshvanatha, whom historians date to 9th century BCE; and the twenty-fourth tirthankara, Mahavira around 600 BCE. Jainism is considered to be an eternal dharma with the tirthankaras guiding every time cycle of the cosmology.

Buddhism

Buddhist practices are known as Bhavana, which literally means "development" or "cultivating" or "producing" in the sense of "calling into existence". It is an important concept in Buddhist praxis (Patipatti). The word bhavana normally appears in conjunction with another word forming a compound phrase such as citta-bhavana (the development or cultivation of the heart/mind) or metta-bhavana (the development/cultivation of loving kindness). When used on its own bhavana signifies 'spiritual cultivation' generally.

Various Buddhist Paths to liberation developed throughout the ages. Best-known is the Noble Eightfold Path, but others include the Bodhisattva Path and Lamrim.

Hinduism
Hinduism has no traditional ecclesiastical order, no centralized religious authorities, no governing body, no prophet(s) nor any binding holy book; Hindus can choose to be polytheistic, henotheistic, pantheistic, monotheistic, or atheistic. Within this diffuse and open structure, spirituality in Hindu philosophy is an individual experience, and referred to as ksaitrajña (Sanskrit: क्षैत्रज्ञ). It defines spiritual practice as one's journey towards moksha, awareness of self, the discovery of higher truths, true nature of reality, and a consciousness that is liberated and content.

Four paths

Traditionally, Hinduism identifies three mārga (ways) of spiritual practice, namely Jñāna(ज्ञान), the way of knowledge; Bhakti, the way of devotion; and Karma yoga, the way of selfless action. In the 19th century Vivekananda, in his neo-Vedanta synthesis of Hinduism, added Rāja yoga, the way of contemplation and meditation, as a fourth way, calling all of them "yoga".

Jñāna marga is a path often assisted by a guru (teacher) in one's spiritual practice. Bhakti marga is a path of faith and devotion to deity or deities; the spiritual practice often includes chanting, singing and music – such as in kirtans – in front of idols, or images of one or more deity, or a devotional symbol of the holy. Karma marga is the path of one's work, where diligent practical work or vartta (Sanskrit: वार्त्ता, profession) becomes in itself a spiritual practice, and work in daily life is perfected as a form of spiritual liberation and not for its material rewards. Rāja marga is the path of cultivating necessary virtues, self-discipline, tapas (meditation), contemplation and self-reflection sometimes with isolation and renunciation of the world, to a pinnacle state called samādhi. This state of samādhi has been compared to peak experience.

There is a rigorous debate in Indian literature on relative merits of these theoretical spiritual practices. For example, Chandogyopanishad suggests that those who engage in ritualistic offerings to gods and priests will fail in their spiritual practice, while those who engage in tapas will succeed; Svetasvataropanishad suggests that a successful spiritual practice requires a longing for truth, but warns of becoming 'false ascetic' who go through the mechanics of spiritual practice without meditating on the nature of Self and universal Truths. In the practice of Hinduism, suggest modern era scholars such as Vivekananda, the choice between the paths is up to the individual and a person's proclivities. Other scholars suggest that these Hindu spiritual practices are not mutually exclusive, but overlapping. These four paths of spirituality are also known in Hinduism outside India, such as in Balinese Hinduism, where it is called Chatur Marga (literally: four paths).

Schools and spirituality
Different schools of Hinduism encourage different spiritual practices. In Tantric school for example, the spiritual practice has been referred to as sādhanā. It involves initiation into the school, undergoing rituals, and achieving moksha liberation by experiencing union of cosmic polarities. The Hare Krishna school emphasizes bhakti yoga as spiritual practice. In Advaita Vedanta school, the spiritual practice emphasizes jñāna yoga in stages: samnyasa (cultivate virtues), sravana (hear, study), manana (reflect) and dhyana (nididhyasana, contemplate).

Sikhism

Sikhism considers spiritual life and secular life to be intertwined: "In the Sikh Weltanschauung ... the temporal world is part of the Infinite Reality and partakes of its characteristics." Guru Nanak described living an "active, creative, and practical life" of "truthfulness, fidelity, self-control and purity" as being higher than a purely contemplative life.

The 6th Sikh Guru Guru Hargobind re-affirmed that the political/temporal (Miri) and spiritual (Piri) realms are mutually coexistent.  According to the 9th Sikh Guru, Tegh Bahadhur, the ideal Sikh should have both Shakti (power that resides in the temporal), and Bhakti (spiritual meditative qualities). This was developed into the concept of the Saint Soldier by the 10th Sikh Guru, Gobind Singh.

According to Guru Nanak, the goal is to attain the "attendant balance of separation-fusion, self-other, action-inaction, attachment-detachment, in the course of daily life", the polar opposite to a self-centered existence. Nanak talks further about the one God or akal (timelessness) that permeates all life). and which must be seen with 'the inward eye', or the 'heart', of a human being.

In Sikhism there is no dogma, priests, monastics or yogis.

African spirituality

In some African contexts, spirituality is considered a belief system that guides the welfare of society and the people therein, and eradicates sources of unhappiness occasioned by evil.
In traditional society prior to colonization and extensive introduction to Christianity or Islam, religion was the strongest element in society influencing the thinking and actions of the people.  Hence spirituality was a sub-domain of religion. Despite the rapid social, economic and political changes of the last century, traditional religion remains the essential background for many African people. And that religion is a communal given, not an individual choice. Religion gives all of life its meaning and provides ground for action. Each person is "a living creed of his religion". There is no concern for spiritual matters apart from ones physical and communal life. Life continues after death but remains focused on pragmatic family and community matters.

Contemporary spirituality

The term spiritual has frequently become used in contexts in which the term religious was formerly employed. Contemporary spirituality is also called "post-traditional spirituality" and "New Age spirituality". Hanegraaf makes a distinction between two "New Age" movements: New Age in a restricted sense, which originated primarily in mid-twentieth century England and had its roots in Theosophy and Anthroposophy, and "New Age" in a general sense, which emerged in the later 1970s:

Those who speak of spirituality outside of religion often define themselves as spiritual but not religious and generally believe in the existence of different "spiritual paths", emphasizing the importance of finding one's own individual path to spirituality. According to one 2005 poll, about 24% of the United States population identifies itself as "spiritual but not religious".

Lockwood draws attention to the variety of spiritual experience in the contemporary West:

The new Western spiritual landscape, characterised by consumerism and choice abundance, is scattered with novel religious manifestations based in psychology and the Human Potential Movement, each offering participants a pathway to the Self.

Characteristics
Modern spirituality centers on the "deepest values and meanings by which people live". It often embraces the idea of an ultimate or an alleged immaterial reality. It envisions an inner path enabling a person to discover the essence of his or her being.

Not all modern notions of spirituality embrace transcendental ideas. Secular spirituality emphasizes humanistic ideas on moral character (qualities such as love, compassion, patience, tolerance, forgiveness, contentment, responsibility, harmony, and a concern for others). These are aspects of life and human experience which go beyond a purely materialist view of the world without necessarily accepting belief in a supernatural reality or any divine being. Nevertheless, many humanists (e.g. Bertrand Russell, Jean-Paul Sartre) who clearly value the non-material, communal, and virtuous aspects of life reject this usage of the term "spirituality" as being overly-broad (i.e. it effectively amounts to saying "everything and anything that is good and virtuous is necessarily spiritual"). In 1930 Russell, a self-described agnostic renowned as an atheist, wrote "... one's ego is no very large part of the world. The man who can centre his thoughts and hopes upon something transcending self can find a certain peace in the ordinary troubles of life which is impossible to the pure egoist."
Similarly, Aristotle – one of the first known Western thinkers to demonstrate that morality, virtue and goodness can be derived without appealing to supernatural forces – argued that "men create Gods in their own image" (not the other way around). Moreover, theistic and atheistic critics alike dismiss the need for the "secular spirituality" label on the basis that it appears to be nothing more than obscurantism in that:
 the term "spirit" is commonly taken as denoting the existence of unseen / otherworldly / life-giving forces; and
 words such as "morality", "philanthropy" and "humanism" already efficiently and succinctly describe the prosocial-orientation and civility that the phrase "secular spirituality" is meant to convey but without risking confusion that one is referring to something supernatural.

Although personal well-being, both physical and psychological, is said to be an important aspect of modern spirituality, this does not imply spirituality is essential to achieving happiness (e.g. see).  Free-thinkers who reject notions that the numinous/non-material is important to living well can be just as happy as more spiritually-oriented individuals (see)

Contemporary proponents of spirituality may suggest that spirituality develops inner peace and forms a foundation for happiness. For example, meditation and similar practices are suggested to help the practitioner cultivate her/his inner life and character.  Ellison and Fan (2008) assert that spirituality causes a wide array of positive health outcomes, including "morale, happiness, and life satisfaction". However, Schuurmans-Stekhoven (2013) actively attempted to replicate this research and found more "mixed" results. Nevertheless, spirituality has played a central role in some self-help movements such as Alcoholics Anonymous:

Such spiritually-informed treatment approaches have been challenged as pseudoscience.

Spiritual experience

Spiritual experiences play a central role in modern spirituality. Both western and Asian authors have popularised this notion. Important early-20th century Western writers who studied the phenomenon of spirituality, and their works, include William James, The Varieties of Religious Experience (1902) and Rudolph Otto, especially The Idea of the Holy (1917)

James' notions of  "spiritual experience" had a further influence on the modernist streams in Asian traditions, making them even further recognisable for a western audience.

William James popularized the use of the term "religious experience" in his The Varieties of Religious Experience. He has also influenced the understanding of mysticism as a distinctive experience which allegedly grants knowledge.

Wayne Proudfoot traces the roots of the notion of "religious experience" further back to the German theologian Friedrich Schleiermacher (1768–1834), who argued that religion is based on a feeling of the infinite. Schleiermacher used the idea of "religious experience" to defend religion against the growing scientific and secular critique. Many scholars of religion, of whom William James was the most influential, adopted the concept.

Major Asian influences on contemporary spirituality have included Swami Vivekananda (1863–1902) and D.T. Suzuki. (1870–1966) Vivekananda popularised a modern syncretic Hinduism, in which an emphasis on personal experience replaced the authority of scriptures. Suzuki had a major influence on the popularisation of Zen in the west and popularized the idea of enlightenment as insight into a timeless, transcendent reality. Other influences came through Paul Brunton's A Search in Secret India (1934), which introduced Ramana Maharshi (1879–1950) and Meher Baba (1894–1969) to a western audience.

Spiritual experiences can include being connected to a larger reality, yielding a more comprehensive self; joining with other individuals or the human community; with nature or the cosmos; or with the divine realm.

Spiritual practices

Kees Waaijman discerns four forms of spiritual practices:
 Somatic practices, especially deprivation and diminishment. Deprivation aims to purify the body. Diminishment concerns the repulsement of ego-oriented impulses. Examples include fasting and poverty.
 Psychological practices, for example meditation.
 Social practices. Examples include the practice of obedience and communal ownership, reforming ego-orientedness into other-orientedness.
 Spiritual. All practices aim at purifying ego-centeredness, and direct the abilities at the divine reality.

Spiritual practices may include meditation, mindfulness, prayer, the contemplation of sacred texts, ethical development,
and spiritual retreats in a convent. Love and/or compassion are often described as the mainstay of spiritual development.

Within spirituality is also found "a common emphasis on the value of thoughtfulness, tolerance for breadth and practices and beliefs, and appreciation for the insights of other religious communities, as well as other sources of authority within the social sciences."

Scientific research

Health and well-being

Various studies (most  originating from North America) have reported a positive correlation between spirituality and mental well-being in both healthy people and those encountering a range of physical illnesses or psychological disorders. Although spiritual individuals tend to be optimistic, report greater social support, and experience higher intrinsic meaning in life, strength, and inner peace, whether the correlation represents a causal link remains contentious. Both supporters and opponents of this claim agree that past statistical findings are difficult to interpret, in large part because of the ongoing disagreement over how spirituality should be defined and measured. There is also evidence that an agreeable/positive temperament and/or a tendency toward sociability (which all correlate with spirituality) might actually be the key psychological features that predispose people to subsequently adopt a spiritual orientation and that these characteristics, not spiritually per se, add to well-being. There is also some suggestion that the benefits associated with spirituality and religiosity might arise from being a member of a close-knit community. Social bonds available via secular sources (i.e.,  not unique to spirituality or faith-based groups) might just as effectively raise well-being. In sum, spirituality may not be the "active ingredient" (i.e., past association with psychological well-being measures might reflect a reverse causation or effects from other variables that correlate with spirituality), and that the effects of agreeableness, conscientiousness, or virtue – personality traits common in many non-spiritual people yet known to be slightly more common among the spiritual – may better account for spirituality's apparent correlation with mental health and social support.

Intercessionary prayer
Masters and Spielmans conducted a meta-analysis of all the available and reputable research examining the effects of distant intercessory prayer.  They found no discernible health effects from being prayed for by others. In fact, one large and scientifically rigorous study by Herbert Benson and colleagues revealed that intercessory prayer had no effect on recovery from cardiac arrest, but patients told people were praying for them actually had an increased risk of medical complications.  Knowing others are praying for you could actually be medically detrimental.

Spiritual care in health care professions

In the health-care professions there is growing interest in "spiritual care", to complement the medical-technical approaches and to improve the outcomes of medical treatments. Puchalski et al. argue for "compassionate systems of care" in a spiritual context.

Spiritual experiences
Neuroscientists have examined brain functioning during reported spiritual experiences finding that certain neurotransmitters and specific areas of the brain are involved.  Moreover, experimenters have also successfully induced spiritual experiences in individuals by administering psychoactive agents known to elicit euphoria and perceptual distortions. Conversely, religiosity and spirituality can also be dampened by electromagnetic stimulation of the brain. These results have motivated some leading theorists to speculate that spirituality may be a benign subtype of psychosis – benign in the sense that the same aberrant sensory perceptions that those suffering clinical psychoses evaluate as distressingly incongruent and inexplicable are instead interpreted by spiritual individuals as positive (personal and meaningful transcendent experiences).

Measurement
Considerable debate persists about – among other factors – spirituality's relation to religion, the number and content of its dimensions, its relation to concepts of well-being, and its universality. A number of research groups have developed instruments which attempt to measure spirituality quantitatively, including the Spiritual Transcendence Scale (STS), the Brief Multidimensional Measure of Religiousness/Spirituality (BMMRS) and the Daily Spiritual Experiences Scale. MacDonald et al. gave an "Expressions of Spirituality Inventory" (ESI-R) measuring five dimensions of spirituality to over 4000 persons across eight countries. The study results and interpretation highlighted the complexity and challenges of measurement of spirituality cross-culturally.

See also

 Anthroposophy
 Esotericism
 Glossary of spirituality terms
 Ietsism
 Interspirituality
 New Age
 Numinous
 Outline of spirituality
 Perennial philosophy
 Reason
 Relationship between religion and science
 Religion
 Sacred–profane dichotomy
 Secular spirituality
 Self-actualization
 Self-help
 Skepticism
 Spiritual activism
 Spiritual but not religious
 Spiritual intelligence
 Spiritism
 Sublime (philosophy)
 Syncretism
 Theosophy

Notes

References

Sources

Published sources

Web-sources

Further reading
 Downey, Michael. Understanding Christian Spirituality. New York: Paulist Press, 1997. . .
 Charlene Spretnak, The Spiritual Dynamic in Modern Art: Art History Reconsidered, 1800 to the Present, 1986. . .
 Eck, D. L. (2009). A new religious America: How a "Christian country" has now become the world's most religiously diverse nation. New York: Harper One. . .
 
 
 Schmidt, L. E. (2012). Restless souls: The making of American spirituality. Berkeley, Calif: University of California Press. . .
 Carrette, J. R., & King, R. (2011). Selling spirituality: The silent takeover of religion. London: Routledge. . .

 
Belief
Metaphysics of mind
New Age
Philosophy of mind